Kaziranga National Park is a national park and an UNESCO World Heritage Site in the Indian state of Assam.
Almost 478 species of birds (both migratory and resident) have been spotted at the park, including 25 globally threatened and 21 near threatened species. The park has also been identified as an Important Bird Area (IBA) by Birdlife International for the conservation of the avifaunal species.
Waterfowl breeds in or passing through Kaziranga includes several rare species of geese (lesser white-fronted goose), and ducks (ferruginous pochard, Baer's pochard). Other rare riverine birds include kingfishers (Blyth's kingfisher), herons (white-bellied heron), pelicans (Dalmatian pelican, spot-billed pelican), shanks (spotted greenshank) and terns (black-bellied tern). Rare migratory storks and cranes are also seen wintering in the park (lesser adjutant, greater adjutant, black-necked stork, Asian openbill).

Kaziranga hosts a large number of raptors, considered a sign of a healthy ecosystem. This includes the rare eastern imperial eagle, greater spotted eagle, white-tailed fishing eagle, Pallas's fish eagle, grey-headed fish eagle and the lesser kestrel. Kaziranga was once home to seven species of vultures. About 99% of the stable vulture population was killed by kidney failure caused by consuming the veterinary drug diclofenac in domestic animal carcasses. Of these, the red-headed vulture, and Eurasian black vulture are still near threatened due to their large range, but the Indian vulture, slender-billed vulture and the Indian white-rumped vulture have suffered cataclysmic loss of numbers and are virtually extinct in the wild, including Kaziranga. The Indian populations of the other two vultures have similar losses — the griffon vulture and the Himalayan griffon, but they are still well represented outside India. The loss of this many vultures creates a critical void in the scavengers' ecological niche in Kaziranga.

Rare game birds (which were once hunted) include partridges (swamp francolin), bustards (Bengal florican) and pigeons (pale-capped pigeon). Several other important families of birds inhabit Kaziranga, including rare species of hornbills (great Indian hornbill and the lesser risk wreathed hornbill), Old World babblers (Jerdon's babbler, marsh babbler) and weaver birds (the common baya weaver and the threatened Finn's weaver), thrushes (Hodgson's bushchat), Old World warblers (bristled grassbird). Other threatened species include the black-breasted parrotbill and rufous-vented prinia.

List
Complete list

References

Birds
Kaziranga National Park
Kaziranga